Cluett is a surname of English origin.

People with the surname

David Cluett (1965–2005), Maltese footballer
E. Harold Cluett (1874–1954), a member of the United States House of Representatives
Frances Cluett (1883–1969), a Canadian nurse and educator
Sanford Lockwood Cluett (1874–1968), an American businessman
Shelagh Cluett (1947–2007), British sculptor

References 

Surnames of English origin